Wray 17-96 is a very luminous star in the Scorpius constellation, about  away.  It is a suspected luminous blue variable (LBV), although it has not shown the characteristic spectral variations.

Wray 17-96 has an absolute bolometric magnitude of −10.9 (1.8 million solar units), making it one of the most luminous stars known.  The spectral type is peculiar, showing emission and absorption, sometimes both in the same line.  Photospheric helium lines are visible indicating that the star is at least somewhat evolved.  It is highly reddened by interstellar extinction and the visual brightness is reduced by nearly 9 magnitudes.

Wray 17-96 is also notable for its highly symmetrical ring-shaped  gas shell, which was originally classified as a planetary nebula.

References

External links
http://jumk.de/astronomie/big-stars/wray-17-96.shtml

Scorpius (constellation)
B-type stars
Luminous blue variables
J17413543-3006389